Villa Elisa is a city in the center-east of the province of Entre Ríos, Argentina. It is located about 25 west of Colón and 20 km from the Uruguay River, on National Route 130.

Like many other towns in this area, Villa Elisa features hot springs. There is a hot spring complex about 5 minutes from the city, which was opened to the public in 1999.

References
  
  ElisaNet, portal of Villa Elisa.

External links

Populated places in Entre Ríos Province
Cities in Argentina
Argentina
Entre Ríos Province